Tartaro, Tartalo, or Torto in Basque mythology, is an enormously strong one-eyed giant very similar to the Greek Cyclops that Odysseus faced in Homer's Odyssey. He is said to live in caves in the mountains and catches young people in order to eat them; in some accounts he eats sheep also.

Alarabi is another name for the creature. Anxo (or Ancho) may also be equivalent, but some sources say this is another name for the Basajaun.

Names
Tartaro (or Tartaroa) is the form given in some translated tales and commentary in French and English

Torto, Anxo and Alarabi were the forms listed in Jose Migel Barandiaran's Basque Mythology, with "Tartalo" described as a local variant particular to the Zegama region. Tartalo being a proper name was an idea floated by Barandiaran; but here is an example of a tale in which three Tartaros appear.

Anxo or Ancho is however explained as an alternate name for Basajaun by some sources. Webster ventured that "Ancho" derived from "Sancho".

Origins
Tartaro has been described as the Basque equivalent to the cyclops Polyphemus, and similarity to this cyclops in Homer's Odyssey is compelling, however direct derivation from Homeric sources may not be necessarily involved, since parallels to these can be found worldwide.

 suggested that name "Tartaro" derived from the Tartar people, just as the word "ogre" derived from "Hungarians", but Wentworth Webster agreed, though he expressed some doubt.

Characteristics
Tartaro according to folktale tradition is a huge, one-eyed being, are usually cave-dwelling, capturing young folk or those who sought shelter in his cave, and devouring them. In one oral account, the Tartaro ate one whole sheep each day.

Themes
A mystical ring is a common theme in the Tartalo/Tartaro tales. In one version, the Tartaro (a prince turned monster who needed a bride to turn back) makes a gift of a ring to a girl, and it turns out to be a "talking ring"; she cuts off her finger to rid herself of it, and the monster. Webster noted this ring motif had its parallel in the Celtic (Scottish Gaelic) Conall Cra Bhuidhe ("Conall Yellowclaw"), published by John Francis Campbell, but none to be found in classical sources.

The motif of the hero blinding Tartaro has both a classical and Celtic (Irish) parallel: Oddyseus blinding the cyclops Polyphemus in Homer's Odyssey and Lug hurling a spear or projectile into the eye of Balor.

Story
One day, while two brothers of the Antimuño baserri were hunting, a storm broke, so they decided to take refuge from the rain in a cave, which was Tartalo's cave. Soon after, Tartalo appeared with his flock of sheep.  He saw the two brothers and said: "one for today and the other for tomorrow".

That same day he cooked and ate the eldest one, and then, he went to sleep.  While he was sleeping, the youngest brother stole Tartalo's ring and then he stuck the roasting spit in his only eye. Tartalo was blind, but not dead yet.

He started to look for the boy among his sheep, but he put on a sheep's skin and escaped from Tartalo. But, unluckily, when he got out of the flock of sheep, the accuser ring started to shout: "Here I am, here I am!".

Tartalo got out of his cave and he started to run after the ring, hearing its shouts. The young one wasn't able to take off the ring, so, when he arrived to the edge of a cliff, he cut off his finger, and since Tartalo was near, he decided to throw it down the cliff. Tartalo, following the ring's shouting, fell off the cliff.

Explanatory notes

References
Citations

Bibliography
 bnf 
 
 
  (English trans.)
 
 Barbier, Jean: Légendes du Pays basque d'après la tradition, illustrations de Pablo Tillac, 1931, Delagrave, Paris. Republished by Elkar (1983), San Sebastián, Bayonne.
Toti Martínez de Lezea "Leyendas de Euskal Herria". Erein 2004

Basque giants
Cyclopes
Basque legendary creatures
Basque mythology